Ioannes I ("John I") may refer to:

 Patriarch John I of Constantinople (c. 347–407)
 John I Tzimiskes (c. 925–976), Byzantine Emperor
 John I Doukas of Thessaly (c. 1240–1289)

See also
John I (disambiguation)
Ioannes II (disambiguation)